Fisher High School or similar names might refer to:

 Ida M. Fisher Junior-Senior High School — a Miami Beach, Florida school whose high school was renamed to Miami Beach High School and whose campus later became Fienberg-Fisher K-8 School
 Fisher Junior/Senior High School (Illinois) — a school in Fisher, Illinois and Fisher Community Unit School District 1; teams are the Bunnies
 Fishers High School — a school in Fishers, Indiana and the Hamilton Southeastern School District; closed in 1969 but re-established at a different location in the 2000s; teams are the Tigers
 Fisher Middle-High School — a school in Lafitte, Louisiana and the Jefferson Parish Public Schools; teams are the Gators
 Fisher Secondary School (Minnesota) — part of Fisher School, the public school in Fisher, Minnesota and the Fisher Public School District; teams are the Knights
 Emily Fisher Charter High School — part of Emily Fisher Charter School in Trenton, New Jersey
 William V. Fisher Catholic High School — a school in Fairfield, Ohio and the Roman Catholic Diocese of Columbus; teams are the Irish
 Fisher Junior-Senior High School (Texas) — a former high school in Athens, Texas and the Athens Independent School District, ended in the 1960s (and whose campus may have been closed as a middle school in the 2000s)

See also
 Fisher School-High Street Historic District — a historic district in Westwood, Massachusetts
 Fisher Park High School — a former high school in Ottawa, Ontario, Canada, that is now a middle school named Fisher Park Public School
 St John Fisher School (disambiguation) — several schools of this name